This list of Angelo State University people includes notable alumni, faculty, and former students of Angelo State University.

Arts and entertainment 
 Sohini Alam (born 1978), British Bangladeshi singer
 Rupert Boneham, contestant on reality TV shows Survivor: Pearl Islands, Survivor: Heroes vs. Villains, Survivor: Blood vs. Water and Survivor: All-Stars; voted a fan favorite and won a million dollar prize; 2012 Libertarian Party candidate for governor of Indiana
Luci Christian, American Anime Awards-nominated Voice actress (Full Metal Panic, Dragon Ball Z: Ultimate Tenkaichi, Dance Dance Revolution Universe)
 Bill Erwin, Emmy Award-nominated actor (The Andy Griffith Show, The West Wing, Seinfeld, My Name Is Earl)
 Jenny Lawson, blogger and author of the #1 New York Times best seller Let's Pretend This Never Happened
 Ilan Mitchell-Smith, actor (The Wild Life, Weird Science); Angelo State professor
 Lucy A. Snyder, author, Bram Stoker Award winner 2010
 David Trevino, Grammy Award winner 2008; musician, Little Joe y La Familia
 Ben Garrison, political cartoonist and artist

Athletics 
 Colby Carthel, head football coach at Texas A&M University–Commerce
 Gary Gaines, head football coach of Permian High School football team, the focus of the book Friday Night Lights: A Town, a Team, and a Dream, the film Friday Night Lights, and the subsequent NBC TV show loosely based on the book and movie; head coach of Abilene Christian University; coach at Texas Tech University
 Alvin Garrett, NFL receiver for the Washington Redskins; played in Super Bowl XVII
 Tranel Hawkins Olympic hurdler
 Mike Jinks, head football coach at Bowling Green University.
 Pierce Holt, NFL defensive lineman for the San Francisco 49ers; played in Super Bowl XXIII, Super Bowl XXIV, and NFL Pro Bowl
Chris Jones (born 1993), basketball player for Maccabi Tel Aviv of the Israeli Basketball Premier League 
 Tramain Jones, former American football defensive back who played in the Arena Football League
 Ken Kennard, NFL defensive lineman for the Houston Oilers
 Jim Morris, MLB player for the Tampa Bay Devil Rays; inspiration for the film The Rookie
 Glen Sefcik, sprint and hurdles coach for the Saudi Arabian Olympic team; head track coach at Wayland Baptist University, Stephen F. Austin State University and Texas A&M University–Kingsville
 Grant Teaff, head football coach, Baylor University, Angelo State; ranked 33rd all-time winningest football coach in NCAA Division I; inducted into the College Football Hall of Fame in 2001
 Wylie Turner, NFL defensive back for the Green Bay Packers
 Clayton Weishuhn, NFL linebacker for the New England Patriots and Green Bay Packers, Super Bowl XX
 Charlie West, NFL safety for the Minnesota Vikings; played in Super Bowl IV

Business and nonprofit 
 A. Mario Castillo, President of Aegis Group; Chief of Staff, United States House Committee on Agriculture; named one of the "Top 25 Hispanic Leaders in the United States" by the U.S. Congressional Hispanic Caucus
 Houston Harte, founder of Harte-Hanks; consultant to President Lyndon B. Johnson
 Alvin New, CEO of Town & Country Food Stores, Stripes Convenience Stores; San Angelo mayor
 Albert Reyes, CEO of Buckner International; President of Baptist University of the Américas
 Cody Matthew Vasquez, 2020 National Collegian of the Year for Delta Sigma Pi
 Michael Gallops, President/CEO of Rowlett Chamber of Commerce; Former Mayor Pro Tem of the City of Rowlett; Biff Bettencourt outstanding Service Award, 2014

Government 
 Troy Fraser, Texas Senate, 24th District
 Rick Green, Texas House, District 45
 Mark Homer, Texas House of Representatives, District 3
 Robert Junell, Texas House of Representatives, Chairman of the House Appropriations Committee
Morris Overstreet, Judge, Texas Court of Criminal Appeals; Judge for Potter County Court at Law No. 1; prosecutor in the 47th Judicial District; General Counsel to the Texas State Baptist Convention; distinguished visiting professor at Thurgood Marshall School of Law; first African-American official elected to statewide office in Texas history
 J.T. Rutherford, United States Representative, Texas's 16th congressional district

Journalism 
 Arnold Garcia, Editorial Editor, Austin American-Statesman; served as both a juror and as a chair of a jury for the Pulitzer Prize
Rena Penderson, Editorial Page Editor at The Dallas Morning News for 16 years; finalist for the Pulitzer Prize; named one of the "Most Powerful Women in Texas" by Texas Monthly, Director of Communications, American College of Education; Senior Advisor, Department of State
 Satcha Pretto, CNN correspondent; anchor of Despierta America on Univision Television Network - Miami
 Renay San Miguel, former CNBC reporter; MarketWatch; anchor of Headline News

Science and education 
 Robert Nason Beck, founder of Center for Imaging Science, University of Chicago
 Dr. Billy Mac Jones, President of Texas State University and Memphis State University
 Ruth J. Person, Chancellor of University of Michigan-Flint; President of Indiana University Kokomo
 Rajesh Rao, Director of NSF Center for Sensorimotor Neural Engineering; Professor of Computer Science and Engineering, University of Washington

References 

Angelo State University people